Theodor Heuss (31 January 1884 – 12 December 1963) was a German liberal politician who served as the first president of West Germany from 1949 to 1959. His cordial nature – something of a contrast to the stern character of chancellor Konrad Adenauer – largely contributed to the stabilization of democracy in West Germany during the Wirtschaftswunder years. Before beginning his career as a politician, Heuss had been a political journalist.

Early life and education
Heuss was born in Brackenheim, a small town and wine-making community near Heilbronn in Württemberg, on the border between the historic regions of Swabia and Franconia. 

He attended the Karlsgymnasium in Heilbronn, from which he graduated in 1902. This selective secondary school has since been renamed the Theodor-Heuss-Gymnasium, in honor of its famous alumnus.

Heuss studied economics, art history and political science at the universities of Munich and Berlin. 

He received his doctorate at Munich, with Lujo Brentano as his thesis adviser, in 1905. He also became a student of Friedrich Naumann, a German politician and theologian. On 11 April 1908, he married Elly Heuss-Knapp (1881–1952), with whom he had a son. The minister at the Lutheran wedding ceremony held in Straßburg was Albert Schweitzer, a close friend of Elly.

Personal life
Heuss was a member of the Evangelical Church in Germany.

Career

After his studies Heuss worked as a political journalist in Berlin and from 1905 until 1912 presided over the magazine Die Hilfe ("The Aid") published by Friedrich Naumann. From 1912 to 1918, he was editor in chief of the Neckarzeitung (Neckar Newspaper) in Heilbronn. In Berlin, he worked as editor for the weekly newsletter Deutsche Politik ("German Politics"). With Naumann, Heuss in 1903 joined the liberal Free-minded Union, which in 1910 merged into the Progressive People's Party (Fortschrittliche Volkspartei), in which he was engaged until its dissolution in 1918.

After World War I, Heuss between 1923 and 1926 published the magazine Die Deutsche Nation ("The German Nation"). He had become a member of the German Democratic Party (Deutsche Demokratische Partei, DDP), from 1930 renamed German State Party (Deutsche Staatspartei, DStP), the political heir of the Fortschrittliche Volkspartei in 1918 and was a member of the Reichstag parliament from 1924 to 1928 and again from 1930 to 1933.

Nazi Germany
On 23 March 1933, along with his four fellow DStP parliamentarians, Heuss voted in favour of the Enabling Act (Ermächtigungsgesetz), granting Chancellor Adolf Hitler quasi-dictatorial powers. He had set out to abstain, but after Heinrich Brüning indicated that with regard to the Reichskonkordat the Centre Party MPs would assent, ultimately subordinated to party discipline.  

Alternative views of Hermann Dietrich, Weimar Republic finance minister claim that he was part of the majority in favor of voting for the enabling law. When Germany became a one-party state, the DStP was dissolved on 28 June 1933 and Heuss was divested of his Reichstag mandate by decree of Minister of the Interior Wilhelm Frick with effect from 8 July.

Following the end of his term he returned to private life. During the Nazi era, he stayed in contact with a network of liberals, leading to contacts with the German resistance towards the end of the war, though he was not an active resister. In 1936 Heuss faced a publication ban, nevertheless in 1941 he became an employee of the Frankfurter Zeitung, one of the few remaining liberal newspapers at that time. Heuss wrote under pseudonyms until publishing of the paper was finally prohibited in 1943. He spent the following years writing a biography of Robert Bosch.

Heuss was a contributor to the Nazi newspaper Das Reich, launched by Joseph Goebbels as a more erudite version of the crude antisemitism promulgated by Nazi publications.

Postwar
After World War II the US Office of Military Government on 24 September 1945 appointed Heuss the first Minister of Education and Cultural Affairs in the German state of Württemberg-Baden under his fellow party member Minister-president Reinhold Maier, in favour of whom he resigned in 1946. As a co-founder of the Democratic People's Party (Demokratische Volkspartei, DVP), the predecessor of the German Free Democratic Party (Freie Demokratische Partei, FDP) in the southwestern German states, he was a member of the Württemberg-Baden state parliament (Landtag) from 1946 to 1949. Heuss also taught history at the Stuttgart Institute of Technology in 1946 and 1947, receiving the title of an honorary professor in 1948.

After plans elaborated with Wilhelm Külz to build up an all-German liberal party had failed, Heuss in December 1948 was elected head of West German and Berlin sections of the newly founded Free Democratic Party. He advocated uniting all liberal parties in the Western occupation zones, overcoming the split between right liberals and left liberals that had existed in the Weimar Republic. In 1948, he was a member of the Parlamentarischer Rat (Parliamentary Council) at Bonn with considerable influence in the drafting of West Germany's constitution, the Basic Law for the Federal Republic of Germany.

Presidency

After being elected to the first German Bundestag, he relinquished his parliamentary mandate on 12 September 1949, when he was elected President by the Federal Convention (Bundesversammlung) defeating the Social Democrat leader Kurt Schumacher in the second ballot. He took the oath required by article 56 of the Basic Law before a joint session of the Bundestag and the Bundesrat on the same date. By the time he was confirmed as the first democratic German president since Paul von Hindenburg, he refused to be called “Excellency”, preferring instead to be called simply “Herr Heuss”, Herr Bundespräsident is the German term of address up to today. Heuss's plans for a new national anthem were aborted by Adenauer, who – in rare accordance with Kurt Schumacher – had the third stanza of the old Deutschlandlied established in 1952.

A widower since 1952, Heuss was re-elected in 1954 with practically no opposition, after the Social Democrats had renounced the nomination of a rival candidate. Not until May 1956, could he make his first state visit, invited by King Paul of Greece. The president, accompanied by Foreign Minister Heinrich von Brentano, was overwhelmed by the warm reception in Athens, considering that the country had heavily suffered under German occupation in World War II. He held office until the end of his term on 12 September 1959, succeeded by Heinrich Lübke. He had declined a third term in office, as this would have necessitated changing the constitution.

Heuss shaped the office of president by his non-partisan governing. As a representative of the democratic-liberal and cultural traditions of Germany, he was a symbol of confidence in the German post-war republic in the international community. His further state visits to Turkey, Italy, Canada, the United States, and the United Kingdom contributed greatly to the increase of appreciation toward the still young Federal Republic of Germany. He was opposed to re-armament and the founding of the new West German Army in 1955, but had no power to stop it. His ironic speech at the swearing in of the first new soldiers, "Nun siegt mal schön!" ("Happy war-winning!"), is well remembered. In 1959, Heuss was awarded the prestigious Friedenspreis des Deutschen Buchhandels. In addressing the memory of Nazism and the Nazi dictatorship, Heuss introduced the concept of collective shame as opposed to collective guilt. His rhetoric encouraged the Germans to never forget the Holocaust and precisely described the crimes against the Jews but he refrained from citing those who were responsible for their suffering.

On 12 December 1963 Heuss died in Stuttgart, aged 79.

In 1957 Heuss donated a sculpted portal entry to the Camposanto of the Teutons and the Flemish in Vatican city. The portal, by sculptor Elmar Hillebrand of Cologne, gives access from the Teutonic Cemetery to the Church of Santa Maria della Pietà in Camposanto dei Teutonici, the National Church in Rome of Austria, Germany, and the Netherlands.

Legacy
Since 1964, the Theodor Heuss Prize has been awarded for exemplary democratic disposition. Heuss's former residence is now open to the public as the Theodor-Heuss-Haus. His image appeared on one series of the two-mark coin and numerous streets and squares all over Germany have been named in his honour. During his time in office, his image also appeared on definitive stamps in West Germany issued between 1954 and 1960. An Airbus A340 aircraft of the Luftwaffe used by the German head of government also carries his name.

Honours and awards
Honorary doctorate from the Free University of Berlin (1949)
Special Class of the Grand Cross of the Order of Merit of the Federal Republic of Germany (1952)
Knight Grand Cross with Collar of the Order of Merit of the Italian Republic (31 December 1953)
Grand Cross with Collar of the Order of the Falcon (Iceland, 1955) 
 (Osnabrück, 1956)
Honorary Citizen of Olympia (1956)
Great Star of Honour for Services to the Republic of Austria (1956)
Honorary doctorate from the Laval University (1958)
Theodor Heuss Chair at The New School

References

External links

dhm.de – Museum of German History 
stiftung-heuss-haus.de – Foundation Theodor-Heuss-Haus  
bundespraesident.de – Office of the President 
 
The German Federal Presidents

 
1884 births
1963 deaths
20th-century presidents of Germany
People from Brackenheim
People from the Kingdom of Württemberg
German Lutherans
National-Social Association politicians
Free-minded Union politicians
Progressive People's Party (Germany) politicians
German Democratic Party politicians
German State Party politicians
Presidents of Germany
Members of the Reichstag of the Weimar Republic
Members of the Bundestag for Baden-Württemberg
German expatriates in Turkey
Grand Crosses Special Class of the Order of Merit of the Federal Republic of Germany
Knights Grand Cross with Collar of the Order of Merit of the Italian Republic
Recipients of the Grand Star of the Decoration for Services to the Republic of Austria
Political party founders
20th-century German journalists
20th-century German male writers
Political journalists
Members of the Bundestag 1949–1953
Members of the Bundestag for the Free Democratic Party (Germany)
Members of Parlamentarischer Rat